Jackson County is located in the western portion of the U.S. state of Missouri, on the border with Kansas. As of the 2020 census, the population was 717,204. making it the second-most populous county in the state (after St. Louis County in the east). It is the most populated county in the Kansas City metropolitan area. 

Although Independence retains its status as the original county seat, Kansas City, Missouri, serves as a second county seat and the center of county government. The county was organized December 15, 1826, and named for former Tennessee senator Andrew Jackson, who would become President of the United States three years later in 1829. Total employment in 2019 was 344,993.

History

Early years
Jackson County was long home to members of the indigenous Osage tribe, who occupied this territory at the time of European encounter. The first known European explorers were French trappers who used the Missouri River as a highway for explorations and trading with regional Native American tribes. Jackson County was claimed as a part of the territory of New France, until 1763 and the British victory in the French and Indian War. After that, France ceded this territory west of the Mississippi River to Great Britain's ally, Spain. In 1800 Spain was forced by France in the Third Treaty of San Ildefonso to return its Louisiana Territory (of which modern Jackson County formed a part) to France. Soon abandoning its claims in North America, Napoleon of France sold the territory to the United States in the Louisiana Purchase of 1803.

Operating on behalf of President Thomas Jefferson, explorers Meriwether Lewis and William Clark passed through Jackson County on their notable Lewis and Clark Expedition in 1804, to survey peoples, property and resources of the Louisiana Territory. Among other items, their report indicated a "high, commanding position" along the river within the current boundaries of Jackson County; in 1808 Fort Osage was constructed there. This stockade and trading post was one of the first U.S. military installations within the Louisiana Purchase territory, and remained active until 1822.

In 1821, Jackson County was included in the newly admitted state of Missouri. Jackson County was organized on December 15, 1826, and named for Andrew Jackson, U.S. Senator from Tennessee and military hero of the War of 1812, who would ascend to the Presidency shortly after, in 1829. Its county seat was designated as Independence, then a minuscule settlement near a spring. However, the rapid increase in westward exploration and expansion ultimately resulted in Independence becoming the starting point for three of the great Westward Trails: the Santa Fe Trail, the Oregon Trail, and the California Trail. Following the American Civil War and construction of railroads through this area, nearby Kansas City, Missouri, ultimately eclipsed Independence, though both towns remain county seats.

In 1838, the "Town Company" bought a small piece of land along the Missouri River in northern Jackson County, establishing "Westport Landing" (today this is known as the River Market district). The area outside Westport Landing was renamed in 1839 as the "Town of Kansas", after the local Kanza or Kaw tribe. 

The town was chartered by Jackson County in 1850 and incorporated by the State of Missouri in 1853 as the "City of Kansas". In 1889, with a population of around 60,000, the city adopted a new charter and changed its name to Kansas City. In 1897, Kansas City annexed Westport.

Latter Day Saints

Jackson County figures prominently in the history of the Latter Day Saint movement.  Although the sect was formed in upstate New York in 1830, in March 1831 Joseph Smith said that a location on the Missouri–Kansas border was to be the latter-day "New Jerusalem" with the "center place" located in Independence, the county seat. Traveling to the area in the Summer of 1831, Smith and some associates formally proclaimed Jackson County as the site, in a ceremony in August 1831.

Leadership and members of the Latter Day Saint movement began moving to Jackson County as soon as word was published of the August 1831 dedication ceremony. Open conflict with earlier settlers ensued, driven by religious and cultural differences. Many early settlers along the Missouri River had come from the Upper South: Kentucky and Tennessee, for instance, and brought their slaves and pro-slavery customs with them. They believed that the "Yankee" Mormons, from New York and northern states, were abolitionists. Mobs in the public and private sector used force to drive individual Saints from Jackson to nearby counties within Missouri; eventually, they put Latter Day Saints on notice that they had until the end of November 6, 1833, to leave the county en masse. On November 23, 1833, the few remaining LDS residents were ordered to leave Jackson County. By mid-1839, following the Missouri Mormon War, the LDS were driven from the state altogether. They did not return to Jackson County or Missouri in significant numbers until 1867, two years after the end of the Civil War.

Civil War
During the Civil War, Jackson County was the scene of several engagements, the most notable of which was the Battle of Westport in 1864, sometimes referred to as "the Gettysburg of Missouri". The Union victory here firmly established Northern control of Missouri, and led to the failure of Confederate General Sterling Price's Missouri expedition. Other noteworthy battles were fought in Independence in 1862, Lone Jack a few days later, and again in Independence in 1864.

Jackson County was strongly affected by Union General Thomas Ewing's infamous General Order No. 11 (1863). With large numbers of Confederate sympathizers living within its boundaries, and active Confederate operations in the area a frequent occurrence, the Union command was determined to deprive Confederate bushwhackers of all local support. Ewing's decree practically emptied the rural portions of the county, and resulted in the burning of large portions of Jackson and adjacent counties. According to American artist George Caleb Bingham, who described the order as "imbecilic" and was a resident of Kansas City at the time, one could see the "dense columns of smoke arising in every direction", symbolic of what he termed "a ruthless military despotism which spared neither age, sex, character, nor condition". Because of the destruction carried out under the order, its legacy haunted Jackson County for decades after the war.

Twentieth century

The coming of the railroads and the building of stockyards led to the rapid expansion of Kansas City in the late 19th century. During the 1920s and '30s, the city became a noted center for Jazz and Blues music, as well as the headquarters of Hallmark Cards and the site of Walt Disney's first animation studio. The county fared better than many during the Great Depression, as local political boss Thomas Pendergast worked to implement a $50,000,000 public works project that provided thousands of jobs. One of Pendergast's political protegés was a young World War I veteran from Independence, Harry S. Truman, who had been his nephew's commanding officer in the war. Truman was elected Presiding Judge (equivalent to a County Executive) of Jackson County with Pendergast support in 1926. He later was elected as a U.S. Senator from Missouri, Vice President and, in 1945, following the death of Franklin D. Roosevelt, succeeded him to become the thirty-third President of the United States. Truman was also elected president in 1948 in his own right.

Following World War II, developers followed new highways and created subdivisions for new housing, which increasingly encroached on rural portions of the county. They provided housing for the nation's returning veterans and their young families. Independence, Blue Springs and Lee's Summit underwent growth during this period, which continues to the present. Kansas City, on the other hand, suffered problems of urban decay as jobs and families left the industrial city, problems common to many large American cities in the late 20th century.

Recent building projects have sought to reverse this trend, including work on the city's famous City Market, Westport district, 18th and Vine Historic District, and most recently, the Kansas City Power & Light District.

Some of the county's local history is presented at the Pleasant Hill Historical Society Museum, in Pleasant Hill on the southern edge of the county.

Government

Jackson County was the second county to adopt a home-rule charter under the Missouri Constitution. The Jackson County Charter was adopted by the voters in 1970 and was amended in 1985 and 1986.

Executive power of the county is vested in the county executive, which is a full-time salaried position. The county executive is elected at-large by the general population of the county for a four-year term.

The County Prosecutor is a full-time salaried position elected at-large by the general population of the county for a four-year term

Ordinances are passed by a county legislature. The legislature is made up of nine members: six are elected from smaller, single-member districts within the county. Three are elected "at large" from larger districts, each by voters of the whole county. Member terms are 4 years, beginning on January 1 following the election.

There are 244,570 registered voters.

Law enforcement
The County Sheriff is a full-time salaried position elected by the general population of the county for a four-year term  the sheriff is Darryl Forté. The Sheriff's Office is also responsible for the county's jail. 
 
Sheriff Mike Sharp resigned in April 2018 amidst scandal. He was the subject of a lawsuit that alleged sexual misconduct, personal use of public funds and sexual harassment. Sheriff Darryl Forté was then appointed. He had recently retired as the chief of the Kansas City Police Department. He was elected to a full term in November of that year.

In mid-2019, Sheriff Forté directed a more-restrictive policy on high-speed pursuits the day after one of his deputies was charged with injuring a bystander during such a chase in May 2018.

Courts
Jackson County is the only county that falls under the jurisdiction of the 16th Judicial Circuit of the Missouri Circuit Courts. The Court seats 19 Circuit Judges and 10 Associate Circuit Judges. All Judges of the court are appointed by the Governor of Missouri, Circuit Judges serve a term of 6 years and Associate judges serve a term of 4 years.

:

Jackson County also has a municipal court with one judge. The Municipal Judge is appointed by the County Executive with approval by the County Legislature and they serve a 4-year term.

Geography

Notable Lakes include
Longview Lake
Lake Jacomo
Blue Springs Lake
Lake Lotawana
Prairie Lee Lake
Lake Tapawingo

The Missouri River comprises Jackson County's northern border (with the exception of one small portion north of the river around the intersection of Highways 210 and 291 as well as all of the 291 bridge). The county has historically been a major traveling point for American river travel.

Adjacent counties

Johnson County, Kansas (west/southwest)
Clay County, Missouri (north)
Wyandotte County, Kansas (west/northwest)
Cass County, Missouri (south)
Lafayette County, Missouri (east)
Ray 
County (northeast)
Johnson County, Missouri (southeast) - not part of the Kansas City metropolitan area

Major highways

 Interstate 29
 Interstate 35
 Interstate 49
 Interstate 70
  Interstate 70 Alternate
 Interstate 435
 Interstate 470
 Interstate 670
 U.S. Route 24
 U.S. Route 24 Bus.
 U.S. Route 40
 U.S. Route 50
 U.S. Route 56
 U.S. Route 71
 U.S. Route 169
 Route 7
 Route 150
 Route 291
 Route 350

National protected area
 Harry S Truman National Historic Site

Demographics

2020 Census

2010 census
As of the 2010 census Jackson County had a population of 674,158.  The racial and ethnic makeup of the population was 63.3% non-Hispanic white, 23.7% non-Hispanic black, 0.5% Native American, 1.6% Asian, 0.4% Pacific Islander alone or in combination with one or more other races, 0.1% non-Hispanic from some other race, 3.8% reporting two or more races and 8.4% Hispanic or Latino.

2000 census
As of the census of 2000, there were 654,880 people, 266,294 households, and 166,167 families residing in the county. The racial makeup of the county was 70.10% White, 23.27% Black or African American, 0.48% Native American, 1.28% Asian, 0.18% Pacific Islander, 2.43% from other races, and 2.25% from two or more races. 5.37% of the population were Hispanic or Latino of any race. 16.7% were of German, 9.1% American, 8.9% Irish and 8.8% English ancestry.

There were 266,294 households, out of which 29.90% had children under the age of 18 living with them, 43.40% were married couples living together, 14.70% had a female householder with no husband present, and 37.60% were non-families. 31.20% of all households were made up of individuals, and 9.90% had someone living alone who was 65 years of age or older. The average household size was 2.42 and the average family size was 3.05.

In the county, the population was spread out, with 25.80% under the age of 18, 9.10% from 18 to 24, 31.10% from 25 to 44, 21.50% from 45 to 64, and 12.50% who were 65 years of age or older. The median age was 35 years. For every 100 females, there were 92.90 males. For every 100 females age 18 and over, there were 89.00 males.

The median income for a household in the county was $39,277, and the median income for a family was $48,435. Males had a median income of $35,798 versus $27,403 for females. The per capita income for the county was $20,788. About 9.00% of families and 11.90% of the population were below the poverty line, including 16.40% of those under age 18 and 8.70% of those age 65 or over.

Religion
According to the Association of Religion Data Archives County Membership Report (2010), Jackson County is sometimes regarded as being on the northern edge of the Bible Belt, with evangelical Protestantism being the most predominant religion. The most predominant denominations among residents in Jackson County who adhere to a religion are Roman Catholics (19.51%), Southern Baptists (17.96%), and non-denominational evangelical Christians (11.52%).

Politics
Jackson County is a solidly Democratic county and has remained so even as the state of Missouri has trended rightward. The last Republican presidential candidate to carry the county was Richard Nixon in 1972, the only Republican to do so since 1932. John Ashcroft was the last Republican gubernatorial candidate in 1988 and Kit Bond for the Senate in 1998. Tom Schweich is the last Statewide Republican candidate to win the county in his landslide victory for State Auditor in 2014. 

The county's Democratic lean is due almost entirely to the presence of Kansas City. In 2008, for example, John McCain barely carried the areas of the county outside Kansas City, but Barack Obama carried Kansas City by a nearly 3-to-1 margin, enough for him to carry the county as a whole with 62 percent of the vote. Generally, Democratic strength is concentrated south of the Missouri River, with the wealthier areas north of the river being more friendly to Republicans.

Education

K-12 schools
School districts include:

 Blue Springs R-IV School District
 Center 58 School District
 Fort Osage R-I School District
 Grain Valley R-V School District
 Grandview C-4 School District
 Hickman Mills C-1 School District
 Independence 30 School District
 Kansas City 33 School District
 Lee's Summit R-VII School District
 Lone Jack C-6 School District
 Oak Grove R-VI School District
 Raytown C-2 School District

Archives
Jackson County Historical Society

Libraries
Kansas City Public Library
Linda Hall Library
Mid-Continent Public Library

Museums
American Jazz Museum
National World War I Museum and Memorial
Nelson-Atkins Museum of Art
Negro Leagues Baseball Museum
Harry S. Truman Library and Museum
Harry S Truman National Historic Site
Jackson County Jail and Marshal's House
National Toy and Miniature Museum
Kemper Museum of Contemporary Art
Kansas City Museum
Missouri Town 1855
Vaile Mansion
Fort Osage National Historic Landmark
Owens-Rogers Museum

Communities

Cities

Blue Springs
Buckner
Grain Valley
Grandview
Greenwood
Independence (co-county seat)
Kansas City (partly in Platte and Clay counties and a small part in Cass County; co-county seat)
Lake Lotawana
Lake Tapawingo
Lee's Summit
Levasy
Lone Jack
Oak Grove
Pleasant Hill (Mostly Cass County, but partly in Jackson County)
Raytown
Sugar Creek

Villages
River Bend
Sibley
Unity Village

Census-designated places
Blue Summit
Tarsney Lakes

Unincorporated communities
Atherton
Blue Mills
 Blue Summit
Cockrell
Courtney
 Hiler
 Hicks City
 Oakland
Pink Hill
 Sni Mills 
Tarsney Lakes

See also
Kaw Township, Jackson County, Missouri
List of counties in Missouri
National Register of Historic Places listings in Jackson County, Missouri

References

External links

 Jackson County government's website
 Jackson County Historical Society's website
 Jackson County, Plat book circa 1930

 
Kansas City metropolitan area
Significant places in Mormonism
Missouri counties on the Missouri River
1826 establishments in Missouri
Populated places established in 1826